The Allegory of the Cave, or Plato's Cave, is an allegory presented by the Greek philosopher Plato in his work Republic (514a–520a) to compare "the effect of education (παιδεία) and the lack of it on our nature". It is written as a dialogue between Plato's brother Glaucon and his mentor Socrates, narrated by the latter. The allegory is presented after the analogy of the sun (508b–509c) and the analogy of the divided line (509d–511e).

In the allegory "The Cave", Plato describes a group of people who have lived chained to the wall of a cave all their lives, facing a blank wall. The people watch shadows projected on the wall from objects passing in front of a fire behind them and give names to these shadows. The shadows are the prisoners' reality, but are not accurate representations of the real world. The shadows represent the fragment of reality that we can normally perceive through our senses, while the objects under the sun represent the true forms of objects that we can only perceive through reason. Three higher levels exist: the natural sciences; mathematics, geometry, and deductive logic; and the theory of forms.

Socrates explains how the philosopher is like a prisoner who is freed from the cave and comes to understand that the shadows on the wall are actually not the direct source of the images seen. A philosopher aims to understand and perceive the higher levels of reality. However, the other inmates of the cave do not even desire to leave their prison, for they know no better life.

Socrates remarks that this allegory can be paired with previous writings, namely the analogy of the sun and the analogy of the divided line.

Summary

Imprisonment in the cave 
Plato begins by having Socrates ask Glaucon to imagine a cave where people have been imprisoned from childhood, but not from birth. These prisoners are chained so that their legs and necks are fixed, forcing them to gaze at the wall in front of them and not to look around at the cave, each other, or themselves (514a–b). Behind the prisoners is a fire, and between the fire and the prisoners is a raised walkway with a low wall, behind which people walk carrying objects or puppets "of men and other living things" (514b).

The people walk behind the wall so their bodies do not cast shadows for the prisoners to see, but the objects they carry do ("just as puppet showmen have screens in front of them at which they work their puppets" (514a). The prisoners cannot see any of what is happening behind them, they are only able to see the shadows cast upon the cave wall in front of them. The sounds of the people talking echo off the walls, and the prisoners believe these sounds come from the shadows (514c).

Socrates suggests that the shadows are reality for the prisoners because they have never seen anything else; they do not realize that what they see are shadows of objects in front of a fire, much less that these objects are inspired by real things outside the cave which they do not see (514b–515a).

Departure from the cave
Socrates then supposes that the prisoners are released. A freed prisoner would look around and see the fire. The light would hurt his eyes and make it difficult for him to see the objects casting the shadows. If he were told that what he is seeing is real instead of the other version of reality he sees on the wall, he would not believe it. In his pain, Socrates continues, the freed prisoner would turn away and run back to what he is accustomed to (that is, the shadows of the carried objects). The light "... would hurt his eyes, and he would escape by turning away to the things which he was able to look at, and these he would believe to be clearer than what was being shown to him."

Socrates continues: "Suppose... that someone should drag him... by force, up the rough ascent, the steep way up, and never stop until he could drag him out into the light of the sun." The prisoner would be angry and in pain, and this would only worsen when the radiant light of the sun overwhelms his eyes and blinds him.

"Slowly, his eyes adjust to the light of the sun. First he can see only shadows. Gradually he can see the reflections of people and things in water and then later see the people and things themselves. Eventually, he is able to look at the stars and moon at night until finally he can look upon the sun itself (516a)." Only after he can look straight at the sun "is he able to reason about it" and what it is (516b). (See also Plato's analogy of the sun, which occurs near the end of The Republic, Book VI.)

Return to the cave
Socrates continues, saying that the free prisoner would think that the world outside the cave was superior to the world he experienced in the cave and attempt to share this with the prisoners remaining in the cave attempting to bring them onto the journey he had just endured; "he would bless himself for the change, and pity [the other prisoners]" and would want to bring his fellow cave dwellers out of the cave and into the sunlight (516c).

The returning prisoner, whose eyes have become accustomed to the sunlight, would be blind when he re-entered the cave, just as he was when he was first exposed to the sun (516e). The prisoners who remained, according to the dialogue, would infer from the returning man's blindness that the journey out of the cave had harmed him and that they should not undertake a similar journey. Socrates concludes that the prisoners, if they were able, would therefore reach out and kill anyone who attempted to drag them out of the cave (517a).

Themes in the allegory appearing elsewhere in Plato's work
The allegory is related to Plato's theory of Forms, according to which the "Forms" (or "Ideas"), and not the material world known to us through sensation, possess the highest and most fundamental kind of reality. Knowledge of the Forms constitutes real knowledge or what Socrates considers "the Good". Socrates informs Glaucon that the most excellent people must follow the highest of all studies, which is to behold the Good. Those who have ascended to this highest level, however, must not remain there but must return to the cave and dwell with the prisoners, sharing in their labors and honors.

Plato's Phaedo contains similar imagery to that of the allegory of the cave; a philosopher recognizes that before philosophy, his soul was "a veritable prisoner fast bound within his body... and that instead of investigating reality of itself and in itself is compelled to peer through the bars of a prison."

Scholarly discussion
Scholars debate the possible interpretations of the allegory of the cave, either looking at it from an epistemological standpoint—one based on the study of how Plato believes we come to know things—or through a political (politeia) lens. Much of the scholarship on the allegory falls between these two perspectives, with some completely independent of either. The epistemological view and the political view, fathered by Richard Lewis Nettleship and A. S. Ferguson, respectively, tend to be discussed most frequently.

Nettleship interprets the allegory of the cave as representative of our innate intellectual incapacity, in order to contrast our lesser understanding with that of the philosopher, as well as an allegory about people who are unable or unwilling to seek truth and wisdom. Ferguson, on the other hand, bases his interpretation of the allegory on the claim that the cave is an allegory of human nature and that it symbolizes the opposition between the philosopher and the corruption of the prevailing political condition.

Cleavages have emerged within these respective camps of thought, however. Much of the modern scholarly debate surrounding the allegory has emerged from Martin Heidegger's exploration of the allegory, and philosophy as a whole, through the lens of human freedom in his book The Essence of Human Freedom: An Introduction to Philosophy and The Essence of Truth: On Plato's Cave Allegory and Theaetetus. In response, Hannah Arendt, an advocate of the political interpretation of the allegory, suggests that through the allegory, Plato "wanted to apply his own theory of ideas to politics". Conversely, Heidegger argues that the essence of truth is a way of being and not an object. Arendt criticised Heidegger's interpretation of the allegory, writing that "Heidegger... is off base in using the cave simile to interpret and 'criticize' Plato's theory of ideas".

Various scholars also debate the possibility of a connection between the work in the allegory and the cave and the work done by Plato considering the analogy of the divided line and the analogy of the sun. The divided line is a theory presented to us in Plato's work the Republic. This is displayed through a dialogue given between Socrates and Glaucon. In which they explore the possibility of a visible and intelligible world. With the visible world consisting of items such as shadows and reflections (displayed as AB) then elevating to the physical item itself (displayed as BC) while the intelligible world consists of mathematical reasoning (displayed by CD) and philosophical understanding (displayed by DE).

Many seeing this as an explanation to the way in which the prisoner in the allegory of the cave goes through the journey. First in the visible world with shadows such as those on the wall. Socrates suggests that the shadows are reality for the prisoners because they have never seen anything else; they do not realize that what they see are shadows of objects in front of a fire, much less that these objects are inspired by real things outside the cave which they do not see then the realization of the physical with the understanding of concepts such as the tree being separate from its shadow. It enters the intelligible world as the prisoner looks at the sun.

The Analogy of the Sun refers to the moment in book six in which Socrates after being urged by Glaucon to define goodness, proposes instead an analogy through a "child of goodness". Socrates reveals this "child of goodness" to be the sun, proposing that just as the sun illuminates, bestowing the ability to see and be seen by the eye, with its light so the idea of goodness illumines the intelligible with truth, leading some scholars to believe this forms a connection of the sun and the intelligible world within the realm of the allegory of the cave.

Influence
The themes and imagery of Plato's cave have appeared throughout Western thought and culture. Some examples include:

 Francis Bacon used the term "Idols of the Cave" to refer to errors of reason arising from the idiosyncratic biases and preoccupations of individuals.
 Thomas Browne in his 1658 discourse Urn Burial stated: "A Dialogue between two Infants in the womb concerning the state of this world, might handsomely illustrate our ignorance of the next, whereof methinks we yet discourse in Platoes denne, and are but Embryon Philosophers".
 Evolutionary biologist Jeremy Griffith's book A Species In Denial includes the chapter "Deciphering Plato's Cave Allegory".
 The films The Conformist, The Matrix, Cube, Dark City, The Truman Show, Us and City of Ember model Plato's allegory of the cave, as does the TV series 1899.'The 2013 movie After the Dark has a segment where Mr. Zimit likens James' life to the Allegory of the Cave.
 The Cave by José Saramago culminates in the discovery of Plato's Cave underneath the center, "an immense complex fusing the functions of an office tower, a shopping mall and a condominium".
 Emma Donoghue acknowledges the influence of Plato's allegory of the cave on her novel Room.
 Ray Bradbury's novel Fahrenheit 451 explores the themes of reality and perception also explored in Plato's allegory of the cave and Bradbury references Plato's work in the novel.
 José Carlos Somoza's novel The Athenian Murders is presented as a murder mystery but features many references to Plato's philosophy including the allegory of the cave.
 Novelist James Reich argues Nicholas Ray's film Rebel Without a Cause, starring James Dean, Natalie Wood, and Sal Mineo as John "Plato" Crawford is influenced by and enacts aspects of the allegory of the cave.
In an episode of the television show Legion, titled "Chapter 16", the narrator uses Plato's Cave to explain "the most alarming delusion of all", narcissism.
H. G. Wells' short novel The Country of the Blind has a similar "Return to the Cave" situation when a man accidentally discovers a village of blind people and wherein he tries to explain how he can "see", only to be ridiculed.
 Daniel F. Galouye's  post-apocalyptic novel Dark Universe describes the Survivors, who live underground in total darkness, using echolocation to navigate. Another race of people evolve, who are able to see using infrared.
 C. S. Lewis' novels The Silver Chair and The Last Battle both reference the ideas and imagery of the Cave.  In the former in Chapter 12, the Witch dismisses the idea of a greater reality outside the bounds of her Underworld.  In The Last Battle most of the characters learn that the Narnia which they have known is but a "shadow" of the true Narnia. Lord Digory says in Chapter 15,  "It's all in Plato, all in Plato".
 In season 1, episode 2 of the 2015 Catalan television series Merlí, titled "Plato", a high school philosophy teacher demonstrates the allegory using household objects for a non-verbal, agoraphobic student, and makes a promise to him that "I'll get you out of the cave".
In the 2016 season 1, episode 1 of The Path, titled "What the Fire Throws", a cult leader uses the allegory in a sermon to inspire the members to follow him "up out of the world of shadows ... into the light".

See also

 Allegorical interpretations of Plato
 Anekantavada 
 Archetype
 Brain in a vat
 Experience machine
 Flatland''
 The Form of the Good
 Intelligibility (philosophy)
 Nous – Noumenon
 Phaneron
 Plato's Republic in popular culture
 Simulation hypothesis
 Holographic principle
 Blind men and an elephant, a rough equivalent in Eastern Philosophy
 Maya (illusion)

References

Further reading 
The following is a list of supplementary scholarly literature on the allegory of the cave that includes articles from epistemological, political, alternative, and independent viewpoints on the allegory:

External links

 
 Ted-ed: Plato's Allegory of the Cave
 Animated interpretation of Plato's Allegory of the Cave
 Plato: The Republic, Book VII at Project Gutenberg
 Plato: The Allegory of the Cave, from The Republic at University of Washington – Faculty
 Plato: Book VII of The Republic, Allegory of the Cave at Shippensburg University
2019 translation of the Allegory of the Cave

Allegory
Concepts in epistemology
Concepts in metaphysics
Platonism
Philosophical analogies
Philosophy of education
Fictional caves